Abu Abd Allah Hamid Mohammed ibn Yusuf al-Arbi al-Fasi (1580–1642), born to the al-Fasi family in Fas in Morocco, is the author of several books among which Mir'at al-Mahâsin min akhbar al-shaykh Abi al-Mahasin (The Mirror of exemplary qualities), written in 1636, is the best known. It is about his father Abu l-Mahasin Yusuf al-Fasi and the beginnings of his family.

References

Moroccan writers
1580 births
1642 deaths
16th-century Moroccan people
17th-century Moroccan people
People from Fez, Morocco
16th-century Arabs
17th-century Arabs